We Can't All Be Angels is the third studio album released by American country music artist David Lee Murphy. It was also his final studio album for MCA, and it produced two singles on the Hot Country Songs charts: "All Lit up in Love" and "Just Don't Wait Around 'Til She's Leavin'".

The album's title track is also included on the soundtrack to the 1998 film Black Dog.

Track listing
All tracks written or co-written by David Lee Murphy. Co-writers are named in parentheses.
"She Don't Try (To Make Me Love Her)" - 3:21
"Just Don't Wait Around 'Til She's Leavin'" - 3:07
"We Can't All Be Angels" (Danny Tate) - 4:18
"Bringin' Her Back" (Bill Lloyd) - 3:26
"Kentucky Girl" - 2:20
"That's Behind Me" - 4:10
"I Could Believe Anything" - 3:37
"All Lit Up in Love" - 2:52
"Almost Like Being There" (Kim Tribble) - 3:21
"Velvet Lies" (Buddy Cannon) - 3:21
"She's Not Mine" - 4:53
"Just Don't Wait Around 'Til She's Leavin'" (alternate version, hidden track) - 3:09

Personnel
Richard Bennett - acoustic guitar, electric guitar, bouzouki
Mike Brignardello - bass guitar
Max Carl - background vocals
Chad Cromwell - drums
Paul Franklin - steel guitar
Liana Manis - background vocals
Brent Mason - acoustic guitar, electric guitar
Terry McMillan - percussion
David Lee Murphy - lead vocals, background vocals, acoustic guitar
Steve Nathan - Hammond organ

Chart performance

References

External links
[ We Can't All Be Angels] at Allmusic

1997 albums
MCA Records albums
David Lee Murphy albums
Albums produced by Tony Brown (record producer)